This is a list of Movie Fights episodes which have been published on YouTube by Screen Junkies.

Episodes

2014

2015

2016

2017

2018

2019

2020

Top contestants

This is the list of contestants with 5 or more appearances who have at least 2 wins among all types of competitions, excluding the episode that aired during the Schmoes Know show between episodes 10 and 11 and the Screen Junkies Plus exclusive fight that aired between episodes 95 and 96. Neither of these fights have statistics recorded, and they do not appear in the list of episodes above.

This list does not count Hal's official win for episode 1. Nor does it count Dan's filling in for four rounds for Mike Carlson (episode 69) or one round for Bryan Chambers (episode 25) as an appearance as a fighter.

Further, the list does not count fighter appearances for episode 110 for Alicia and Dan, who competed in a Speed Round after Alicia activated the Show Stopper.

Title belt match history

Notes

External links
 YouTube
 
 

Lists of web series episodes